Paul McCartney's awards include eight BRIT Awards,  eighteen Grammy Awards, two American Music Awards, one MTV Video Music Award, one MTV Europe Music Award, one Broadcast Film Critics Association Awards, one Classical Brit Awards and two UK's Q Awards. As a member of The Beatles, his songwriting partnership with John Lennon produced "some of the most popular music in rock and roll history".

In the United Kingdom, McCartney has been knighted and was made a Member of the Most Excellent Order of the British Empire (MBE). In 2017, he was appointed to the Order of the Companions of Honour (CH) for services to music.

In the United States, McCartney received the Library of Congress Gershwin Prize for Popular Song and Kennedy Center Honors in 2010.

In May 2011 in Peru, he received the Grand Cross of the Order of the Sun, La Orden del Arbol de la Quina for his environmental protection work, and the Medal of Honor from the National Library of Peru.

On 8 September 2012 in France, McCartney was awarded the Legion of Honour for services to music by French President François Hollande at the Élysée Palace.

NME awards

Critics' Choice Movie Awards
Paul McCartney has won once Broadcast Film Critics Association Awards in the category of Critics' Choice Movie Award for Best Song for "Vanilla Sky" (from Vanilla Sky) in 2001.

|-
| 2001 || "Vanilla Sky"  || Best Song || 
|-
| 2009 || "(I Want to) Come Home"  || Best Song ||

BMI Latin Awards
The BMI Latin Awards are awarded annually by Broadcast Music, Inc. for the best-performing Latin songs. McCartney has received one award for Manny Manuel's cover "I Want to Hold Your Hand".

Academy Awards
The Academy Awards are awarded annually. Paul McCartney has won once with the Beatles, and has been nominated for two more awards.

|-
| 1971 || Let It Be  || Best Original or Adaptation Score || 
|-
| 1974 || "Live and Let Die"  || Best Original Song || 
|-
| 2002 || "Vanilla Sky"  || Best Original Song ||

American Music Awards
The American Music Awards are awarded annually. Paul McCartney won two awards and has been nominated for two.

|-
| 1975 || Wings || Favorite Pop/Rock Band/Duo/Group || 
|-
| 1983 || Paul McCartney || Favorite Pop/Rock Male Artist || 
|-
| 1983 || "Ebony and Ivory"  || Favorite Pop/Rock Song || 
|-
| 1986 || Paul McCartney || Merit || 
|-
| 1997 || The Beatles Anthology || Favorite Pop/Rock Album || 
|-
| 2015 || "FourFiveSeconds"  || Collaboration of the Year ||

Brit Awards
The Brit Awards are awarded annually by the British Phonographic Industry. McCartney has won 7 awards

|-
| rowspan="4" | 1977 || rowspan="2" | The Beatles || British Group || 
|-
| Outstanding Contribution to Music || 
|-
| Sgt. Peppers Lonely Hearts Club Band || British Album of the Year || 
|-
| "She Loves You" || British Single of the Year || 
|-
| rowspan="3" | 1983 || rowspan="2" | Paul McCartney || British Male Solo Artist || 
|-
| Sony Trophy Award for Technical Excellence || 
|-
| The Beatles || Outstanding Contribution to Music || 
|-
| 1984 || Paul McCartney || British Male Solo Artist || 
|-
| rowspan="2" | 1985 || Paul McCartney || British Male Solo Artist || 
|-
| Give My Regards to Broad Street || Soundtrack/Cast Recording || 
|-
| rowspan="2" | 1990 || "Ferry Cross the Mersey" || British Single of the Year || 
|-
| "My Brave Face" || British Video of the Year || 
|-
| 2008 || Paul McCartney || Outstanding Contribution to Music ||

Classic Brit Awards

|-
| 2007 || Ecce Cor Meum || Album of the Year ||

Golden Globe Awards

|-
| 1985
| "No More Lonely Nights"
| Best Original Song
| 
|-
| 2002
| "Vanilla Sky"
| Best Original Song
| 
|-
| 2010
| "(I Want to) Come Home"
| Best Original Song
| 
|}

Grammy Awards
The Grammy Award are awarded annually by the National Academy of Recording Arts and Sciences in the United States.

In addition to his 18 Grammy wins, McCartney received the academy's MusiCares Person of the Year award in 2012. McCartney was honoured with a Grammy Lifetime Achievement Award twice. The first in 1990 for his solo work and then with The Beatles in 2014. The Beatles were also, honoured with a Grammy Trustees Award in 1972.

|-
| rowspan="6" | 1965 || "I Want to Hold Your Hand" || Record of the Year || 
|-
| "A Hard Day's Night" || Song of the Year || 
|-
| The Beatles || Best New Artist || 
|-
| rowspan="3" | A Hard Day's Night || Best Performance by a Vocal Group || 
|-
| Best Rock & Roll Recording || 
|-
| Best Original Score from a Motion Picture or Television Show || 
|-
| rowspan="9" | 1966 || rowspan="4" | Help! || Album of the Year || 
|-
| Best Performance by a Vocal Group Performance || 
|-
| Best Contemporary (R&R) Performance – Group (Vocal or Instrumental) || 
|-
| Best Original Score Written for a Motion Picture or Television Show || 
|-
| rowspan="5" | "Yesterday" || Record of the Year || 
|-
| Song of the Year || 
|-
| Best Vocal Performance, Male || 
|-
| Best Contemporary (R&R) Vocal Performance – Male || 
|-
| Best Contemporary (R&R) Single || 
|-
| rowspan="5" | 1967 || Revolver || Album of the Year || 
|-
| "Michelle" || Song of the Year || 
|-
| rowspan="3" | "Eleanor Rigby" || Best Vocal Performance, Male || 
|-
| Best Contemporary (R&R) Solo Vocal Performance – Male or Female || 
|-
| Best Contemporary (R&R) Recording || 
|-
| rowspan="5" | 1968 || rowspan="4" | Sgt. Pepper's Lonely Hearts Club Band || Album of the Year || 
|-
| Best Contemporary Album || 
|-
| Best Performance by a Vocal Group || 
|-
| Best Contemporary Group Performance (Vocal or Instrumental) || 
|-
| "A Day in the Life" || Best Instrumental Arrangement Accompanying Vocalist(s)/Best Background Arrangement || 
|-
| rowspan="4" | 1969 || Magical Mystery Tour || Album of the Year || 
|-
| rowspan="3" | "Hey Jude" || Record of the Year || 
|-
| Song of the Year || 
|-
| Best Contemporary Pop Performance – Vocal, Duo or Group || 
|-
| rowspan="3" | 1970 || rowspan="2" | Abbey Road || Album of the Year || 
|-
| Best Contemporary Vocal Performance by a Group || 
|-
| Yellow Submarine || Best Original Score Written for a Motion Picture or a Television Special || 
|-
| rowspan="5" | 1971 || rowspan="3" | "Let It Be" || Record of the Year || 
|-
| Song of the Year || 
|-
| Best Contemporary Song || 
|-
| rowspan="2" | Let It Be || Best Contemporary Vocal Performance by a Duo, Group or Chorus || 
|-
| Best Original Score Written for a Motion Picture or a Television Special || 
|-
| 1972 || "Uncle Albert/Admiral Halsey"  || Best Arrangement Accompanying Vocalist(s) || 
|-
| rowspan="2" | 1974 || "Live and Let Die" || Best Contemporary Vocal Performance by a Duo, Group or Chorus || 
|-
| Live and Let Die || Album of Best Original Score Written for a Motion Picture || 
|-
| rowspan="2" | 1975 || Band on the Run || Album of the Year || 
|-
| "Band on the Run" || Best Pop Vocal Performance by a Duo, Group or Chorus || 
|-
| 1977 || "Let 'Em In" || Best Arrangement Accompanying Vocalist(s) || 
|-
| 1980 || "Rockestra Theme" || Best Rock Instrumental Performance || 
|-
| 1981 || "Coming Up " || Best Rock Vocal Performance, Male || 
|-
| 1982 || The McCartney Interview || Best Spoken Word, Documentary or Drama Recording || 
|-
| rowspan="4" | 1983 || Tug of War || Album of the Year || 
|-
| rowspan="2" | "Ebony and Ivory"  || Record of the Year || 
|-
| Best Pop Performance by a Duo or Group with Vocals || 
|-
| "What's That You're Doing?" || Best R&B Vocal performance by a Duo or Group with Vocals || 
|-
| 1984 || "The Girl Is Mine"  || Best Pop Performance by a Duo or Group with Vocals || 
|-
| 1986 || "Do They Know It's Christmas?"  || Best Music Video, Short Form || 
|-
| 1987 || "Rupert and the Frog Song" || Best Music Video, Short Form || 
|-
| 1996 || Live at the BBC || Best Historical Album || 
|-
| rowspan="3" | 1997 || The Beatles Anthology || Best Long Form Music Video || 
|-
| rowspan="2" | "Free as a Bird" || Best Pop Performance by a Duo or Group with Vocals || 
|-
| Best Short Form Music Video || 
|-
| 1998 || Flaming Pie || Album of the Year || 
|-
| 2001 || Liverpool Sound Collage || Best Alternative Music Album || 
|-
| 2003 || "Vanilla Sky"  || Best Song Written for a Motion Picture, Television or Other Visual Media || 
|-
| 2005 || "Something"  || Best Pop Collaboration with Vocals || 
|-
| rowspan="3" | 2006 || rowspan="2" | Chaos and Creation in the Backyard || Album of the Year || 
|-
| Best Pop Vocal Album || 
|-
| "Fine Line" || Best Male Pop Vocal Performance || 
|-
| 2007 || "Jenny Wren" || Best Male Pop Vocal Performance || 
|-
| rowspan="3" | 2008 || Memory Almost Full || Best Pop Vocal Album || 
|-
| "Dance Tonight" || Best Male Pop Vocal Performance || 
|-
| "Only Mama Knows" || Best Solo Rock Vocal Performance || 
|-
| rowspan="2" | 2009 || "That Was Me" || Best Male Pop Vocal Performance || 
|-
| "I Saw Her Standing There" || Best Solo Rock Vocal Performance || 
|-
| 2011 || "Helter Skelter"  || Best Solo Rock Vocal Performance || 
|-
| 2012 || Band on the Run  || Best Historical Album || 
|-
| 2013 || Kisses on the Bottom || Best Traditional Pop Vocal Album || 
|-
| rowspan="3" | 2014 || "Cut Me Some Slack"  || Best Rock Song || 
|-
| Live Kisses || Best Music Film || 
|-
| Ram  || Best Historical Album || 
|-
| rowspan="2" | 2016 || rowspan="2" | "All Day"  || Best Rap Performance || 
|-
| Best Rap Song || 
|-
| 2017 || Tug of War  || Best Boxed Or Special Limited Edition Package || 
|-
| 2021 || Flaming Pie  || Best Boxed Or Special Limited Edition Package || 
|-
| rowspan="2" | 2022 || "Find My Way" || Best Rock Song || 
|-
|McCartney III || Best Rock Album || 

Grammy Trustees Award

|-
| 1972 || The Beatles || Trustees Award || 

Grammy Lifetime Achievement Award

|-
| 1990 || Paul McCartney || Lifetime Achievement Award || 
|-
| 2014 || The Beatles || Lifetime Achievement Award || 

Grammy Hall of Fame

|-
| 1993 || Sgt. Pepper's Lonely Hearts Club Band || Hall of Fame  || 
|-
| 1995 || Abbey Road || Hall of Fame  || 
|-
| 1997 || "Yesterday" || Hall of Fame  || 
|-
| 1998 || "I Want to Hold Your Hand" || Hall of Fame  || 
|-
| rowspan="2" | 1999 || Revolver || Hall of Fame  || 
|-
| "Strawberry Fields Forever" || Hall of Fame  || 
|-
| rowspan="3" | 2000 || Rubber Soul || Hall of Fame  || 
|-
| A Hard Day's Night || Hall of Fame  || 
|-
| The Beatles (White Album) || Hall of Fame  || 
|-
| rowspan="2" | 2001 || "Hey Jude" || Hall of Fame  || 
|-
| Meet the Beatles! || Hall of Fame  || 
|-
| 2002 || "Eleanor Rigby" || Hall of Fame  || 
|-
| 2004 || "Let It Be" || Hall of Fame  || 
|-
| 2008 || "Help!" || Hall of Fame  || 
|-
| 2011 || "Penny Lane" || Hall of Fame  || 
|-
| 2013 || Band on the Run || Hall of Fame  || 

MusiCares Person of the Year

|-
| 2012 || Paul McCartney || Person of the Year ||

MTV Video Music Awards
The MTV Video Music Awards are awarded annually by MTV. McCartney has won 1.

|-
| 1984 || The Beatles || Video Vanguard Award ||

MTV Europe Music Awards
The MTV Europe Music Awards are awarded annually by MTV. McCartney has one.

|-
| 2008 || Paul McCartney || Ultimate Legend Award ||

MVPA Awards
The Music Video Production Association (MVPA) is a non-profit trade organization created to address the mutual concerns of its members in today's highly competitive, ever-changing music video industry.

|-
| rowspan=2|2008
| "Dance Tonight"
| rowspan=2|Best International Video
| 
|-
| "Ever Present Past"
|

Primetime Emmy Awards
The Primetime Emmy Award is an American accolade bestowed by the Academy of Television Arts & Sciences in recognition of excellence in American primetime television programming.

Q Awards
The Q Awards are awarded annually by Q magazine.

National Academy of Video Game Trade Reviewers Awards
The National Academy of Video Game Trade Reviewers (NAVGTR) awards are awarded annually by National Academy of Video Game Trade Reviewers.

|-
| 2014
| Paul McCartney – Hope for the Future
| Song, Original or Adapted
|

Gershwin Prize for Popular Song
The Library of Congress Gershwin Prize for Popular Song, created in 2007, is awarded annually. On 2 June 2010, in a White House ceremony, McCartney received this prize from President Obama. The Gershwin Prize is the highest award a musician can receive in the United States; McCartney is the first non-American recipient of the award, the previous recipients were Paul Simon and Stevie Wonder.

Orders, awards and honours

Sir Paul was also considered for a Peerage in March 2022 for his 80th birthday.

References

Awards
McCartney, Paul
McCartney, Paul